The Detroit Finnish Cooperative Summer Camp Association is a camping facility located at 2524 Loon Lake Road in Wixom, Michigan.  It was designated a Michigan State Historic Site in 1997 and listed on the National Register of Historic Places in 2007.

History
In about 1906, a group of Detroit-area people of Finnish descent formed the Detroit Finnish Educational Association to preserve and share the traditions of their native land.  The Association members participated in communal summer activities, often renting beaches and parks for camping and swimming.  In 1925, the Association formed a committee to select a permanent spot for the group's outdoor activities.  After some searching, the committee selected the present site, and formed the Detroit Finnish Cooperative Summer Camp Association as a separate organization, open to anyone who was "of Finnish descent, Finnish speaking, of good character and [living] in the Detroit area." In June 1925, the Summer Camp Association purchased this land with the purpose of constructing a permanent summer camp . The first sauna was constructed in 1926, and the dance hall in 1927.

Description
The Detroit Finnish Cooperative Summer Camp Association, fondly known as “Finn Camp”, is set on a wooded property along Loon Lake, and entirely surrounds the smaller Sun Lake.  The property is bounded by Loon Lake, the Hickory Hill Golf and Country Club, the Detroit Finnish Cooperative Summer Camp Association subdivision, and the Loon Lake Estates subdivision.

References

Further reading

External links
Detroit Finnish Cooperative Summer Camp Association home page

Buildings and structures completed in 1926
Buildings and structures in Oakland County, Michigan
Michigan State Historic Sites
Finnish-American culture in Michigan
Summer camps in Michigan
Historic districts on the National Register of Historic Places in Michigan
National Register of Historic Places in Oakland County, Michigan
Temporary populated places on the National Register of Historic Places